Sabatinca calliarcha is a species of moth belonging to the family Micropterigidae. It was described by Edward Meyrick in 1912. It is endemic to New Zealand. It is found in two separate areas of New Zealand - the first in the norther parts of the North Island including Great Barrier Island and the second population can be found from the top of the South Island down to Southland. The adults of the species are on the wing from the end of September until the middle of January. The species prefers to inhabit damp forests and larvae likely feed on leafy liverwort species. Adult moths likely feed on the spores of ferns or the pollen of sedge grasses.

Taxonomy 
This species was described by Edward Meyrick in 1912 using a specimen collected in December by Alfred Philpott at Blue Cliffs, Te Waewae Bay in Fiordland. George Hudson described and illustrated this species in his 1928 publication The butterflies and moths of New Zealand. The male holotype specimen is held at the Natural History Museum, London.

Description

Meyrick described the adults of this species as follows:

The wingspan of this species is approximately 1 cm. In comparison to other species in the Sabatinca genus the forewing pattern of S. calliarcha is more complex and variable.

Distribution
This species is endemic to New Zealand. This species is very wide spread being found in the northern parts of the North Island, that is the Waitākere and Coromandel ranges as well as Great Barrier Island, and in the South Island from Nelson down to the Southland and Fiordland. It has been hypothesised that these two populations have been separated for a long period of time.

Behaviour 
Adults are on the wing from the end of September until the middle of January. Adult moths have been seen resting on algae covered stones where it's wing colouration ensures it is well camouflaged. When disturbed it takes flight and comes to rest a short distance away. It is very difficult to see when on the wing.

Host species and habitat 
Like other species in the genus Sabatinca the larvae of S. calliarcha likely feed on foliose liverworts. The adults of the species likely feeding on fern spores or sedge pollen. This species prefers to inhabit damp forests.

References

Micropterigidae
Moths described in 1912
Endemic fauna of New Zealand
Moths of New Zealand
Taxa named by Edward Meyrick
Endemic moths of New Zealand